Goldschläger is a Swiss cinnamon schnapps (43.5% alcohol by volume or 87 proof; originally it was 53.5% alcohol or 107 proof), a liqueur with very thin, yet visible flakes of gold floating in it. , this amounts to €0.66/US$0.75 on the international gold market.

Goldschläger was produced in Switzerland until the 1990s. The brand was acquired by Diageo, which moved production to Italy. In 2008, Global Brands Limited (UK) purchased the brand as part of its portfolio and production returned to Switzerland. In November 2018, Diageo agreed to sell Goldschläger as part of a 19-brand portfolio of spirits brands to the New Orleans–based U.S. distiller Sazerac Company as part of a $550M deal. 

The German word  ("gold beater") refers to the profession of gold leaf makers who beat bars of gold into extremely thin sheets.

References 

Gold
Herbal liqueurs
Swiss drinks